Dr. Noëlle Healy is a senior Dublin ladies' footballer. She was a member of the Dublin teams that won the All-Ireland Senior Ladies' Football Championship in 2010, 2017, 2018 , 2019 and 2020. She captained Dublin in the 2016 final and was named Player of the Match following the 2017 final. In 2017 she was also named the TG4 Senior Player's Player of the Year. She was the first Dublin player to win the award. She was also a member of the Dublin team that won the 2018 Ladies' National Football League and in the same year collected her fourth All Star award.

Early years, family and education
Healy was born in Belgium but is from Castleknock. She was educated at Loreto College on St Stephen's Green and represented the school at basketball. She made her first trip to Croke Park in 2002, when her father brought her to see the 2002 All-Ireland Senior Ladies' Football Championship Final. Between 2009 and 2015 she attended University College Dublin on a sports scholarship and studied medicine.

Career

In 2015, Healy qualified as a doctor. She specialises in anaesthesia. She has trained and worked at various Dublin hospitals including St. Vincent's University Hospital, the Mater, Beaumont Hospital and Holles Street Hospital. On 24 December 2018, while working at Connolly Hospital, Healy responded on Twitter to a comment earlier made by the Taoiseach, Leo Varadkar. Varadkar had suggested that nurses, doctors and healthcare workers in emergency departments should not take holidays during the Christmas/New Year period. Healy tweeted "Three 24 hour shifts in 6 days and 2 in the last three. It cool if I take a day or two off to celebrate Christmas with my fam". In 2019 Healy began working at Cork University Hospital.

Playing career

Clubs
St Brigid's
Healy began playing Gaelic football when she was nine. She initially played informally on the green in front of her house before asking her mother to take to her local GAA club, St Brigid's. Between 2015 and 2018, Healy played in three Dublin Ladies' Senior Football Championship finals for St Brigid's.

UCD
Between 2009 and 2015, while attending University College Dublin on a sports scholarship, Healy also played for UCD GAA in the O'Connor Cup.

Mourneabbey
In March 2019, after her job as a doctor saw her transfer to Cork University Hospital, Healy switched from St Brigid's to Mourneabbey.

Inter-county
Together with Niamh McEvoy, Sinéad Goldrick and Hannah Tyrrell, Healy was part of a generation of Dublin ladies' footballers who won All-Ireland titles at under-14, under-16 and under-18 levels before playing for the senior team. Healy began playing for the senior team in 2007 at the age of 16. She was a member of the Dublin team that won the 2010 All-Ireland Senior Ladies' Football Championship Final. Heally was a regular in the Dublin team during the 2010s, finishing as an All-Ireland runner-up in 2014, 2015 and 2016. She captained Dublin in the 2016 final. She was subsequently a member of the Dublin teams that won the 2017, 2018, and 2019 All-Ireland finals. In 2017, after she was named Player of the Match in the 2017 final, she was also named the TG4 Senior Player's Player of the Year. She was the first Dublin player to win the award. She was also a member of the Dublin team that won the 2018 Ladies' National Football League. In 2018 Healy collected her fourth All Star award.

Honours
Dublin
All-Ireland Senior Ladies' Football Championship
Winners: 2010, 2017, 2018, 2019, 2020: 5
Runner up: 2014, 2015, 2016: 3
Ladies' National Football League 
 2018
All-Ireland Under-18 Ladies' Football Championship
Winners: 2008
All-Ireland Under-16 Ladies' Football Championship
Winners: 2006
All-Ireland Under-14 Ladies' Football Championship
Winners: 2004
St Brigid's
Dublin Ladies' Senior Football Championship
Runner up: 2015, 2016, 2018: 3
Individual
TG4 Senior Player's Player of the Year
Winner: 2017
All Stars
Winner: 2014, 2016, 2017, 2018: 4

References

Living people
Dublin inter-county ladies' footballers
St Brigid's (Dublin) Gaelic footballers
UCD Gaelic footballers
Alumni of University College Dublin
People from Castleknock
Sportspeople from Fingal
21st-century Irish medical doctors
Irish women's basketball players
Year of birth missing (living people)
Winners of four All-Ireland medals (ladies' football)
People educated at Loreto College, St Stephen's Green